Unley Park railway station is located on the Belair line in suburban Adelaide. Situated seven kilometres from Adelaide station, it is on the boundary between Hawthorn and Westbourne Park, on the south side of Cross Road.

History 

The station was opened around the 1910s.

It was temporarily closed in 1995 when one set of tracks through the station was converted to standard gauge as part of the One Nation Adelaide-Melbourne line gauge conversion project. The western platform was demolished as part of the project.

Services by platform

Bus transfers
The closest bus stops are Stop 173 on Cross Road and Stop 12 on Hilda Terrace.

|}

|}

Gallery

References

External links

Flickr gallery

Railway stations in Adelaide